Nicholas Charles Dingley (2 December 1960 – 8 December 1984), better known by his stage name Razzle, was the English drummer of Finnish glam rock band Hanoi Rocks from 1982 until his death.

Early years
Born in Royal Leamington Spa, England, to a young single mother, Patricia Ingram, who decided to give up her child for adoption. He was adopted by Henry and Irene Dingley. The family's only child, he grew up in Coventry, after which the family moved to the village of Binstead, Isle of Wight.

Prior to joining Hanoi Rocks, Razzle started playing in local Binstead small ensembles, one of which was called Thin Red Line. In 1980 he moved to London, where he played in several punk rock bands. Also, he joined Demon Preacher (featuring Nik Wade, later of Alien Sex Fiend), The Fuck Pigs and The Dark, with whom he released one EP The Living End Live in 1981, which was recorded at the band's last gig in London's 100 Club which, in his own words, was heavy punk, almost heavy metal.

Hanoi Rocks

Razzle collaborated with Hanoi Rocks for the first time on Sounds magazine pages. After seeing the band performing at the Zig-Zag Club, Razzle was convinced that this was a band he would definitely join. He came backstage and asked to be the band's drummer. Gyp Casino, who was the band's current drummer, was fired for his porn addiction, depression, and suicidal thoughts, and Razzle was hired. Although Razzle was depicted on the Self Destruction Blues album cover, he didn't play on the record.

He became an important element of Hanoi Rocks, due to his repartee and an ability to find a way out of difficult times and problems between members. Having a perpetual sense of humour, charismatic Razzle was able to crack a joke in any situation.

In 1983, Sami Yaffa disclosed that he and Razzle were planning to leave the band, citing Andy McCoy's insufferable behaviour as the main cause.

In 1984 Razzle along with the other members of Hanoi Rock appeared on the first eponymous album by the punk band Fallen Angels, a project of Knox of The Vibrators. At the time Knox and the Hanoi Rocks shared the same manager.

Death
In late 1984, Hanoi Rocks were on their first American tour. Frontman Michael Monroe fractured his ankle, so the band had to skip a few gigs and take a break. During that break, Mötley Crüe's singer Vince Neil invited the band to visit his home in Redondo Beach, California.

On December 8th, Hanoi Rocks band members were partying with Mötley Crüe at lead singer Vince Neil's house. The party stopped when everybody noticed they were out of beer. Neil and Razzle, both drunk, went to a nearby liquor store in Neil's De Tomaso Pantera, with Neil driving. On the way back, they crashed into another car. Razzle was rushed to the hospital and pronounced dead at 7:12 p.m.; he had died instantly in the collision.

Both occupants of the other car were seriously injured, sustaining brain damage as a result of the crash. Vince Neil was charged with vehicular manslaughter and driving under the influence of alcohol in connection with the crash. His blood alcohol content was 0.17, well above the California legal limit at that time of 0.10. In September 1985, Los Angeles County Superior Court Judge Edward Hinz, Jr., sentenced Neil to 30 days in jail and five years probation 

Andy McCoy and Mötley Crüe drummer Tommy Lee went looking for Neil and Razzle. They drove by the crash site and sadly saw Neil handcuffed and put into a police car. They were informed that Razzle had been taken to a hospital where he was pronounced dead. McCoy informed the band's manager Seppo Vesterinen, who then told the rest of the band.

He was buried at Holy Cross Church in Binstead, on the Isle of Wight in 1984.

Neil dedicated Theatre of Pain, Mötley Crüe's third studio album, to Razzle. In 2015 Neil admitted to Ultimate Classic Rock that he wrote a check for $2.5 million to the courts, so he only ever served 19 days of a 30-day sentence for the reckless death.

Neil's account of this event, while contradictory to witnesses accounts, is documented in Mötley Crüe's 2001 autobiography The Dirt: Confessions of the World's Most Notorious Rock Band. Max Milner portrayed Razzle in the 2019 film adaptation.

Discography

With Hanoi Rocks
Studio albums
 Back to Mystery City (1983)
 Two Steps from the Move (1984)

Live albums
 All Those Wasted Years (1984)
 The Nottingham Tapes (2008) (Video)

Compilation albums
 The Best of Hanoi Rocks (1985)
 Million Miles Away (1985)
 Dead By Christmas (1986)
 The Collection (1989)
 Up Around The Bend, Super Best (1989)
 Tracks From A Broken Dream (1990)
 Hanoi Rocks Story (1990)
 Strange Boys Play Weird Openings (4 cd) (1991)
 Lean on Me (1992)
 All Those Glamorous Years - Best of Hanoi Rocks & Michael Monroe (1996)
 Decadent, Dangerous, Delicious (2 cd) (2000)
 Kill City Kills (2000)
 Hanoi Rocks box set (4 cd) (2001)
 Up Around The Bend... The Definitive Collection (2 cd) (2004)
 Lightning Bar Blues - The Definitive Collection (6 cd) (2005)
 This One Is For Rock'n'Roll - The Best of Hanoi Rocks 1980-2008 (2 cd) (2008)
 Ripped Off - Odd Tracks & Demos (2 cd) (2010)
 Hanoi Rocks Sound Pack 26 (2010)
 Hanoi Rocks Parhaat (2011)
 The Johanna Years (3 cd) (2014)
 Strange Boys Box (5 cd/6lp) (2018)

With Fallen Angels
Studio albums
 Fallen Angels (1984)

References

External links

 The death of Razzle: the story of Vince Neil and a car crash, Classic Rock, December 08, 2016

1960 births
1984 deaths
People from Leamington Spa
English heavy metal drummers
Road incident deaths in California
Hanoi Rocks members
20th-century English musicians